Radical 61 or radical heart meaning "heart" is one of 34 of the 214  Kangxi radicals that are composed of 4 strokes.

When appearing at the left side of a Chinese character, the radical transforms into , which consists of three strokes. When appearing at the bottom, it sometimes transforms into .

In the Kangxi Dictionary, there are 1,115 characters (out of 40,000) to be found under this radical.

 is also the 98th indexing component in the Table of Indexing Chinese Character Components predominantly adopted by Simplified Chinese dictionaries published in mainland China.

Evolution

Derived characters

Literature 

Leyi Li: “Tracing the Roots of Chinese Characters: 500 Cases”. Beijing 1993,

See also
Heart (Chinese medicine)

External links 

Unihan Database - U+5FC3
Full list of characters with radical 61

061
098